Attila Zabos born 21 August 1980 in Kazincbarcika) is a retired Hungarian football player.

References
Profile at HLSZ.
Profile at MLSZ.

1980 births
Living people
People from Kazincbarcika
Hungarian footballers
Association football midfielders
Diósgyőri VTK players
Kazincbarcikai SC footballers
Vasas SC players
MTK Budapest FC players
Nyíregyháza Spartacus FC players
Putnok VSE footballers
Sportspeople from Borsod-Abaúj-Zemplén County